Jiangbeicheng  is a station on Line 6 and Line 9 of Chongqing Rail Transit in Chongqing Municipality, China, which opened in 2016. It is located in Jiangbei District.

Station structure
An opposite direction cross-platform interchange is provided between Line 6 and Line 9.

References

Jiangbei District, Chongqing
Railway stations in Chongqing
Railway stations in China opened in 2016
Chongqing Rail Transit stations